Success is a 1923 American silent drama film directed by Ralph Ince and starring Brandon Tynan, Naomi Childers, and Mary Astor.

Cast

Preservation
With no prints of Success located in any film archives, it is a lost film.

References

Bibliography
 Lowe, Denise. An Encyclopedic Dictionary of Women in Early American Films: 1895-1930. Routledge, 2014.

External links

1923 films
1923 drama films
Silent American drama films
Films directed by Ralph Ince
American silent feature films
1920s English-language films
American black-and-white films
Metro Pictures films
1920s American films